A Depression and Deep Depressions are categories used by the India Meteorological Department (IMD) to classify tropical cyclones, within the North Indian Ocean tropical cyclone basin between the Malay Peninsula and the Arabian Peninsula.

Background
The North Indian Ocean tropical cyclone basin is located to the north of the Equator, and encompasses the Bay of Bengal and the Arabian Sea, between the Malay Peninsula and the Arabian Peninsula. The basin is officially monitored by the India Meteorological Department's Regional Specialized Meteorological Centre in New Delhi, however, other national meteorological services such as the Bangladesh and Pakistan Meteorological Department's also monitor the basin.

Systems

|-
| Unnamed ||  ||  ||  ||  || Sri Lanka, Tamil Nadu, Andrah Pradesh, Orissa || || ||
|-
| Unnamed ||  ||  ||  || || || || ||
|-
| Unnamed ||  ||  ||  ||  || || || ||
|-
| Unnamed ||  ||  ||  ||  || || || ||
|-
| Unnamed ||  ||  ||  || || || || ||
|-
| Unnamed ||  ||  ||  ||  || || || ||
|-
| Land ||  ||  ||  || || || || ||
|-
| Unnamed ||  ||  ||  ||  || || || ||
|-
| Unnamed ||  ||  ||  || || || || ||
|-
| Unnamed ||  ||  ||  || || || || ||
|-
| Unnamed ||  ||  ||  || || || || ||
|-
| Land ||  ||  ||  || || West Bengal ||  || ||
|-
| Unnamed ||  ||  ||  ||  || || || ||
|-
| Unnamed ||  ||  ||  ||  || || || ||
|-
| Unnamed ||  ||  ||  || || West Bengal || || ||
|-
| Unnamed ||  ||  ||  || || || || ||
|-
| Unnamed ||  ||  ||  || || Gujarat || || ||
|-
| Unnamed ||  ||  ||  || || Bangladesh || || ||
|-
| Unnamed ||  ||  ||  ||  || Orissa || || ||
|-
| Unnamed ||  ||  ||  || || Sunderbans || || ||
|-
| Unnamed ||  ||  ||  || || Orissa || || ||
|-
| Unnamed ||  ||  ||  ||  || Indochina, Bangladesh, West Bengal || || ||
|-
| Unnamed ||  ||  ||  || || Sri Lanka, Tamil Nadu || || ||
|-
| Unnamed ||  ||  ||  || || Bangladesh, Myanmar || || ||
|-
| Unnamed ||  ||  ||  ||  || Orissa || || ||
|-
| Unnamed ||  ||  ||  ||  || Burma, Orissa || || ||
|-
| Unnamed ||  ||  ||  ||  || Burma, Orissa || || ||
|-
| Unnamed ||  ||  ||  ||  || Burma, West Bengsl || || ||
|-
| Unnamed ||  ||  ||  || || Andrah Pradesh || || ||
|-
| Unnamed ||  ||  ||  || || Saudi Arabia || || ||
|-
| Unnamed ||  ||  ||  ||  || Tamil Nadu || || ||
|-
| Unnamed ||  ||  ||  ||  || Gugarat || || ||
|-
| Unnamed ||  ||  ||  ||  || Orissa || || ||
|-
| Unnamed ||  ||  ||  || || West Bengal || || ||
|-
| Land ||  ||  ||  || || West Bengal || || ||
|-
| Unnamed ||  ||  ||  ||  || West Bengal || || ||
|-
| Land ||  ||  ||  || || Madhya Pradesh || || ||
|-
| Unnamed ||  ||  ||  || || Andrah Pradesh || || ||
|-
| Unnamed ||  ||  ||  ||  || Andrah Pradesh || || ||
|-
| Unnamed ||  ||  ||  || || Oman || || ||
|-
| Unnamed ||  ||  ||  || || Oman || || ||
|-
| Unnamed ||  ||  ||  || || Madhya Pradesh || || ||
|-
| Land ||  ||  ||  ||  || West Bengal, Bangladesh || || ||
|-
| Unnamed ||  ||  ||  ||  || Madhya Pradesh || || ||
|-
| Land ||  ||  ||  || || Madhya Pradesh || || ||
|-
| Unnamed ||  ||  ||  ||  || Andrah Pradesh, Orissa || || ||
|-
| Unnamed ||  ||  ||  ||  || Somalia || || ||
|-
| Unnamed ||  ||  ||  ||  || Myanmae || || ||
|-
| Sally ||  ||  ||  || || Philippines, Vietnam, Thailand, Myanmar, Andaman and Nicobar Islands || || ||
|-
| Unnamed ||  ||  ||  || || Sri Lanka, Tamil Nadu || || ||
|-
| Unnamed ||  ||  ||  ||  || Orissa || || ||
|-
| Unnamed ||  ||  ||  ||  || Orissa || || ||
|-
| Unnamed ||  ||  ||  ||  || Gulf of Aden || || ||
|-
| Unnamed ||  ||  ||  || || Gujarat || || ||
|-
| Unnamed ||  ||  ||  ||  || Uttar Pradesh || || ||
|-
| Unnamed ||  ||  ||  ||  || Orissa || || ||
|-
| Unnamed ||  ||  ||  || || West Bengal || || ||
|-
| Unnamed ||  ||  ||  || || || || ||
|-
| Unnamed ||  ||  ||  ||  || Tamil Nadu || || ||
|-
| Unnamed ||  ||  ||  || || Sri Lanka || || ||
|-
| Unnamed ||  ||  ||  ||  || Orissa || || ||
|-
| Unnamed ||  ||  ||  || || Orissa || || ||
|-
| Unnamed ||  ||  ||  ||  || Orissa || || ||
|-
| Unnamed ||  ||  ||  || || || || ||
|-
| Unnamed ||  ||  ||  || || Andrah Pradesh || || ||
|-
| Unnamed ||  ||  ||  ||  || Burma || || ||
|-
| Unnamed ||  ||  ||  || || || || ||
|-
| Unnamed ||  ||  ||  || || Orissa || || ||
|-
| Unnamed ||  ||  ||  ||  || Orissa || || ||
|-
| Unnamed ||  ||  ||  ||  || West Bengal || || ||
|-
| Unnamed ||  ||  ||  || || Orissa || || ||
|-
| Unnamed ||  ||  ||  ||  || West Bengal || || ||
|-
| Unnamed ||  ||  ||  || || Orissa || || ||
|-
| Unnamed ||  ||  ||  ||  || West Bengal || || ||
|-
| Unnamed ||  ||  ||  || || || || ||
|-
| Unnamed ||  ||  ||  ||  || Bangladesh, West Bengal || || ||
|-
| Unnamed ||  ||  ||  ||  || Orissa || || ||
|-
| Unnamed ||  ||  ||  ||  || Orissa || || ||
|-
| Unnamed ||  ||  ||  ||  || || || ||
|-
| Unnamed ||  ||  ||  ||  || West Bengal || || ||
|-
| Unnamed ||  ||  ||  || || || || ||
|-
| Land ||  ||  ||  || || || || ||
|-
| Unnamed ||  ||  ||  ||  || || || ||
|-
| Unnamed ||  ||  ||  ||  || || || ||
|-
| Unnamed ||  ||  ||  || || || || ||
|-
| Unnamed ||  ||  ||  ||  || || || ||
|-
| Unnamed ||  ||  ||  ||  || || || ||
|-
| Unnamed ||  ||  ||  ||  || || || ||
|-
| Unnamed ||  ||  ||  ||  || || || ||
|-
| Unnamed ||  ||  ||  || || || || ||
|-
| Unnamed ||  ||  ||  || || || || ||
|-
| Unnamed ||  ||  ||  ||  || || || ||
|-
| Unnamed ||  ||  ||  || || || || ||
|-
| Unnamed ||  ||  ||  || || || || ||
|-
| Unnamed ||  ||  ||  ||  || || || ||
|-
| Unnamed ||  ||  ||  ||  || || || ||
|-
| Unnamed ||  ||  ||  ||  || || || ||
|-
| Unnamed ||  ||  ||  || || || || ||
|-
| Unnamed ||  ||  ||  || || || || ||
|-
| Unnamed ||  ||  ||  ||  || || || ||
|-
| Unnamed ||  ||  ||  ||  || || || ||
|-
| Unnamed ||  ||  ||  ||  || || || ||
|-
| Unnamed ||  ||  ||  ||  || || || ||
|-
| Unnamed ||  ||  ||  || || || || ||
|-
| Unnamed ||  ||  ||  || || || || ||
|-
| Unnamed ||  ||  ||  ||  || || || ||
|-
| Unnamed ||  ||  ||  ||  || || || ||
|-
| Unnamed ||  ||  ||  || || || || ||
|-
| Unnamed ||  ||  ||  || || || || ||
|-
| Land ||  ||  ||  || || || || ||
|-
| Land ||  ||  ||  || || || || ||
|-
| Land ||  ||  ||  || || || || ||
|-
| Unnamed ||  ||  ||  || || || || ||
|-
| Land ||  ||  ||  || || || || ||
|-
| Unnamed ||  ||  ||  ||  || || || ||
|-
| Unnamed ||  ||  ||  || || || || ||
|-
| Unnamed ||  ||  ||  ||  || || || ||
|-
| Unnamed ||  ||  ||  ||  || || || ||
|-
| Unnamed ||  ||  ||  ||  || || || ||
|-
| Unnamed ||  ||  ||  || || || || ||
|-
| Unnamed ||  ||  ||  || || || || ||
|-
| Land ||  ||  ||  || || || || ||
|-
| Unnamed ||  ||  ||  || || || || ||
|-
| Unnamed ||  ||  ||  ||  || || || ||
|-
| Land ||  ||  ||  ||  || || || ||
|-
| ARB 13 ||  ||  ||  ||  || || || ||
|-
| BOB 03 ||  ||  ||  ||  || || || ||
|-
| BOB 04 ||  ||  ||  ||  || || || ||
|-
| Land ||  ||  ||  ||  || || || ||
|-
| BOB 05 ||  ||  ||  ||  || West Bengal, Bangladesh || || ||
|-
| Land ||  ||  ||  ||  || Uttar Pradesh || || ||
|-
| BOB 06 ||  ||  ||  ||  || || || ||
|-
| BOB 07 ||  ||  ||  ||  || || || ||
|-
| BOB 08 ||  ||  ||  ||  || || || ||
|-
| ARB 14 ||  ||  ||  ||  || || || ||
|-
| BOB 11 ||  ||  ||  ||  || || || ||
|-
| Unnamed ||  ||  ||  ||  || || || ||
|-
| BOB 12 ||  ||  ||  ||  || || || ||
|-
| ARB 01 ||  ||  ||  ||  || Gujarat || || ||
|-
| BOB 02 ||  ||  ||  ||  || || || ||
|-
| Land ||  ||  ||  ||  || || || ||
|-
| Land ||  ||  ||  ||  || || || ||
|-
| Land ||  ||  ||  ||  || Sri Lanka || || ||
|-
| ARB 01 ||  ||  ||  ||  || Gujarat || || ||
|-
| BOB 02 ||  ||  ||  ||  || || || ||
|-
| BOB 03 ||  ||  ||  ||  || || || ||
|-
| ARB 07 ||  ||  ||  ||  || || || ||
|-
| BOB 03 ||  ||  ||  ||  || || || ||
|-
| Land ||  ||  ||  ||  || || || ||
|-
| BOB 04 ||  ||  ||  ||  || || || ||
|-
| BOB 05 ||  ||  ||  ||  || || || ||
|-
| Land ||  ||  ||  ||  || || || ||
|-
| BOB 07 ||  ||  ||  ||  || || || ||
|-
| ARB 07 ||  ||  ||  ||  || || || ||
|-
| BOB 11 ||  ||  ||  ||  || || || ||
|-
| BOB 01 ||  ||  ||  ||  || || || ||
|-
| Land ||  ||  ||  ||  || || || ||
|-
| Land ||  ||  ||  ||  || || || ||
|-
| BOB 04 ||  ||  ||  ||  || || || ||
|-
| BOB 05 ||  ||  ||  ||  || || || ||
|-
| BOB 06 ||  ||  ||  ||  || || || ||
|-
| ARB 08 ||  ||  ||  ||  || || || ||
|-
| Land ||  ||  ||  ||  || || || ||
|-
| Land ||  ||  ||  ||  || || || ||
|-
| Land ||  ||  ||  ||  || || || ||
|-
| ||  ||  ||  ||  || || || ||
|-
| ||  ||  ||  ||  || || || ||
|-
| ||  ||  ||  ||  || || || ||
|-
| ||  ||  ||  ||  || || || ||
|-
| ||  ||  ||  ||  || || || ||
|-
| ||  ||  ||  ||  || || || ||
|-
| ||  ||  ||  ||  || || || ||
|-
| ||  ||  ||  ||  || || || ||
|-
| ||  ||  ||  ||  || || || ||
|-
| ||  ||  ||  ||  || || || ||
|-
| ||  ||  ||  ||  || || || ||
|-
| ||  ||  ||  ||  || || || ||
|-
| ||  ||  ||  ||  || || || ||
|-
| ||  ||  ||  ||  || || || ||
|-
| Land ||  ||  ||  ||  || || || ||
|-
| BOB 02 ||  ||  ||  ||  || || || ||
|-
| BOB 03 ||  ||  ||  ||  || || || ||
|-
| BOB 04 ||  ||  ||  ||  || || || ||
|-
| BOB 05 ||  ||  ||  ||  || || || ||
|-
| BOB 06 ||  ||  ||  ||  || || || ||
|-
| BOB 07 ||  ||  ||  ||  || || || ||
|-
| BOB 08 ||  ||  ||  ||  || || || ||
|-
| ARB 01 ||  ||  ||  ||  || || || ||
|-
| BOB 03 ||  ||  ||  ||  || || || ||
|-
| BOB 04 ||  ||  ||  ||  || India || || ||
|-
| BOB 05 ||  ||  ||  ||  || || || ||
|-
| BOB 06 ||  ||  ||  ||  || || || ||
|-
| BOB 07 ||  ||  ||  ||  || || || ||
|-
| BOB 02 ||  ||  ||  ||  || Odisha || ||  ||
|-
| BOB 03 ||  ||  ||  ||  || || || ||
|-
| BOB 04 ||  ||  ||  ||  || Andhra Pradesh || || ||
|-
| ARB 03 ||  ||  ||  ||  || || || || 
|-
| ARB 04 ||  ||  ||  ||  || || || ||
|-
| BOB 01 ||  ||  ||  ||  || || || ||
|-
| BOB 03 ||  ||  ||  ||  || || || ||
|-
| BOB 01 ||  || ||  || || None || None || None ||
|-
| Unnamed ||  || ||  ||  || India, Pakistan || None || None || 
|-
| Unnamed ||  || ||  ||  || India || || 38 || 
|-
| Unnamed ||  || ||  || || Southern India || None || None ||
|-
| BOB 01 ||  ||  ||  ||  || South India || rowspan=2|39 || rowspan=2| ||rowspan=2|
|-
| BOB 02 ||  ||  ||  ||  || South India
|-
| BOB 03 ||  ||  ||  ||  || Odisha ||  || Unknown ||
|-
| BOB 04 ||  ||  ||  ||  || Myanmar, Odisha, East India || None || None ||
|-
| BOB 05 ||  ||  ||  ||  || West Bengal, East India || None|| None ||
|-

|-
| ARB 02 ||  ||  ||  ||  || || || ||
|-
| BOB 02 ||  ||  ||  ||  || || || ||
|-
| Land ||  ||  ||  ||  || || || ||
|-
| Land ||  ||  ||  ||  || || || ||
|-
| ARB 01 ||  ||  ||  ||  || || || ||
|-
| Land ||  ||  ||  ||  || || || ||
|-
| BOB 02 ||  ||  ||  ||  || || || ||
|-
| BOB 03 ||  ||  ||  ||  || || || ||
|-
| ARB 02 ||  ||  ||  ||  || || || ||
|-
| BOB 04 ||  ||  ||  ||  || || || ||
|-
| BOB 05 ||  ||  ||  ||  || || || ||
|-
| BOB 08 ||  ||  ||  ||  || || || ||
|-
| ARB 01 ||  ||  ||  ||  || || || ||
|-
| BOB 02 ||  ||  ||  ||  || || || ||
|-
| BOB 03 ||  ||  ||  ||  || || || ||
|-
| BOB 04 ||  ||  ||  ||  || || || ||
|-
| BOB 05 ||  ||  ||  ||  || || || ||
|-
| BOB 06 ||  ||  ||  ||  || || || ||
|-
| BOB 07 ||  ||  ||  ||  || || || ||
|-
| Land ||  ||  ||  ||  || || || ||
|-
| BOB 08 ||  ||  ||  ||  || || || ||
|-
| BOB 01 ||  ||  ||  ||  || || || ||
|-
| BOB 04 ||  ||  ||  ||  || || || ||
|-
| BOB 05 ||  ||  ||  ||  || || || ||
|-
| BOB 06 ||  ||  ||  ||  || || || ||
|-
| BOB 07 ||  ||  ||  ||  || || || ||
|-
| BOB 08 ||  ||  ||  ||  || || || ||
|-
| ARB 02 ||  ||  ||  ||  || || || ||
|-
| ARB 01 ||  ||  ||  ||  || || || ||
|-
| BOB 02 ||  ||  ||  ||  || || || ||
|-
| BOB 03 ||  ||  ||  ||  || || || ||
|-
| BOB 04 ||  ||  ||  ||  || || || ||
|-
| ARB 02 ||  ||  ||  ||  || || || ||
|-
| BOB 08 ||  || ||  ||  || Sri Lanka, India ||align=right|  ||align=right|  ||
|-
| ARB 01 ||  ||  ||  ||  || India || || 9 ||
|-
| ARB 02 ||  ||  ||  ||  || India || || ||
|-
| BOB 03 ||  ||  ||  ||  || || || ||
|-
| BOB 04 ||  ||  ||  ||  || || || ||
|-
| BOB 02 ||  ||  ||  ||  || || || ||
|-
| BOB 03 ||  ||  ||  ||  || || || ||
|-
| BOB 06 ||  ||  ||  ||  || || || ||
|-
| BOB 01 ||  ||  ||   ||  || || || ||
|-
| ARB 01 ||  ||  ||  ||  || || || ||
|-
| BOB 02 ||  ||  ||  ||  || || || ||
|-
| Land ||  ||  ||  ||  || || || ||
|-
| BOB 03 ||  ||  ||  ||  || || || ||
|-
| BOB 04 ||  ||  ||  ||  || || || ||
|-
| ARB 03 ||  ||  ||  ||  || || || ||
|-
| ARB 04 ||  ||  ||  ||  || || || ||
|-
| BOB 01 ||  ||  ||  ||   || || || ||
|-
| BOB 03 ||  ||  ||  ||   || || || ||
|-
| ARB 02 ||  ||  ||  ||  || || || ||
|-
| BOB 02 ||  ||  ||  ||  || || || ||
|-
| BOB 03 ||  ||  ||  ||  || || || ||
|-
| Land ||  ||  ||  ||  || || || ||
|-
| ARB 01 ||  ||  ||  ||  || || || ||
|-
| Wilma ||  ||  ||  ||  || || || ||
|-
| BOB 01 ||  ||  ||  ||  || Sri Lanka || Minor || None ||
|-
| BOB 02 ||  ||  ||  ||  || Andaman and Nicobar Islands, India || || ||
|-
| Land ||  ||  ||  ||  || || || ||
|-
| Land ||  ||  ||  ||  || || || ||
|-
| BOB 04 ||  ||  ||  ||  || ||  ||  ||
|-
| BOB 01 ||  ||  ||  ||  || East India || || ||
|-
| ARB 02 ||  ||  ||  ||  || West India || || ||
|-
| Land ||  ||  ||  ||  || North India, Nepal || None || None ||
|-
| Land ||  ||  ||  ||  || Central India || None || None ||
|-
| Land ||  ||  ||  ||  || Central India || None || None ||
|-
| Land ||  ||  ||  ||  || Central India || None || None ||
|-
| ARB 03 ||  ||  ||  ||  || None || None || None ||
|-
| BOB 03 ||  ||  ||  ||  || South India, Sri Lanka || Unknown ||  ||
|-
| ARB 01 ||  ||  ||  ||  || Oman, Gujarat || None || None ||
|-
| Land ||  ||  ||  ||  || East India || Unknown || None ||
|-
| Land ||  ||  ||  ||  || East India, Bangladesh || Minimal || 20 ||
|-
| BOB 02 ||  ||  ||  ||  || East India, Bangladesh || Unknown || 17 ||
|-
| BOB 04 ||  ||  ||  ||  || Malaysia, Thailand, West Bengal, Bangladesh || Unknown || 80 ||
|-
| ARB 02 ||  ||  ||  ||  || Somalia || Unknown || None ||
|-
| BOB 03 ||  ||  ||  ||  || Northeast India, Bangladesh || || ||
|-
| BOB 04 ||  ||  ||  ||  || Orissa, Madhya Pradesh, Chhattisgarh || || ||
|-
| Land ||  ||  ||  ||  || West Bengal, Jharkhand, Madhya Pradesh || || ||
|-
| Land ||  ||  ||  ||  || Bangladesh, West Bengal, Jharkhand, Odisha, Andhra Pradesh || Unknown || 7 ||
|-
| BOB 05 ||  ||  ||  ||  || Odisha, West Bengal, Northeastern India, Bangladesh || Unknown || 1 ||
|-
| BOB 06 ||  ||  ||  ||  || Odisha, West Bengal, Andhra Pradesh || Unknown || 20 ||
|-
| BOB 08 ||  ||  ||  ||  || || || ||
|-
| ARB 01 ||  ||  ||  ||  || South India, Maldives || None || None ||
|-
| BOB 01 ||  ||  ||  ||  || Myanmar || None || 5 ||
|-
| BOB 02 ||  ||  ||  ||  || Bangladesh || None || None ||
|-
| BOB 03 ||  ||  ||  ||  || East India, North India || Unknown || 69 ||
|-
| BOB 04 ||  ||  ||  ||  || East India || None || None ||
|-
| BOB 05 ||  ||  ||  ||  || East India, Central India, West India || Unknown || None ||
|-
| BOB 06 ||  ||  ||  ||  || East India || Unknown || None ||
|-
| BOB 03 ||  ||  ||  ||   || East India, Bangladesh ||  ||  ||
|-
| Land ||  ||  ||  ||  || || || || 
|-
| ARB 06 ||  ||  ||  ||  || Tamil Nadu ||  ||  ||
|-
| ARB 08 ||  ||  ||  ||  || Socotra, Somalia ||  ||  ||
|-
| ARB 01 ||  ||  ||  ||  || Oman, Yemen ||  Unknown ||  ||  
|-
| BOB 02||  ||  ||  ||  || India || || || 
|-
| ARB 03 ||  ||  ||  ||  || Maharashtra ||  Minimal || None || 
|-
| BOB 03 ||  ||  ||  ||  || West Bengal, Bangladesh, Northeast India ||  Minimal || None ||
|}

Other systems
Over the years, other systems have been classified as a tropical depression, by other warning centres such as the United States Joint Typhoon Warning Center, Thai or Bangladesh Meteorological Departments. However, these systems have not been formally recognised as a cyclonic disturbance by the IMD.

Durian 2006

Climatology

See also

 South-West Indian Ocean tropical cyclone

Notes

References

NIO DD